Muhammad A. S. Abdel Haleem (born 1930), is an Egyptian Islamic studies scholar and the King Fahd Professor of Islamic Studies at the School of Oriental and African Studies, University of London (SOAS) in London, England. He is the editor of the Journal of Qur'anic Studies.

Biography

Born in Egypt in 1930, Abdel Haleem learned the Quran by heart during his childhood. He studied at Al-Azhar University and completed his PhD at the University of Cambridge. He has lectured at SOAS since 1971. In 2004, Oxford University Press published his translation of the Quran into English. He has also published several other works in this field.

Abdel Haleem was appointed an Officer of the Order of the British Empire (OBE) in the Queen's 2008 Birthday Honours, in recognition of his services to Arabic culture, literature and inter-faith understanding.

Works
 2006 with Robinson, Danielle (eds.), The Moral World of the Qur'an, London: IB Tauris.
 2006 "Islam, Religion of the Environment" in Cotran, E. and Lau, M. (eds.), Yearbook of Islamic and Middle Eastern Law, Netherlands: E.J. Brill, pp. 403–410.
 2006 "Arabic and Islam" in Brown, Keith (ed.), Encyclopedia of Language and Linguistics, Oxford: Elsevier, pp. 34–37.
 2006 "Qur'an and Hadith" in Winter, Tim (ed.), The Cambridge Companion to Classical Islamic Theology, UK: Cambridge University Press.
 2005 with Badawi, Elsaid M., Dictionary of Qur'anic Usage, E. J. Brill.
 2004 The Qur'an: a New Translation, Oxford, UK: Oxford University Press (Oxford World's Classics Hardcovers Series).
 2002 "The Prophet Muhammad as a Teacher: implications for Hadith literature" in Islamic Quarterly vol. XLVI (2), pp. 121–137.
 1999 Understanding the Qur'an: themes and style, London: I B Tauris.
 1999 "Human Rights in Islam and the United Nations Instruments" in Cotran, E. and Sherif, A. (eds.), Democracy the rule of law and Islam, London: Kluwer Law International, pp. 435–453.
 1995 (as translator) Chance or creation? God's design in the Universe (attributed to Jahiz, translated and introduced), Reading, Berkshire: Garnet.
 1994 "Qu'ranic Orthography: the written presentation of the recited text of the Qur'an" in Islamic Quarterly, vol. 38 (3), pp. 171–192.

References

External links
The Online Quran Project includes the Qur'an translation, The Qur'an: a New Translation, of Abdel-Haleem.
Qur'an Presentations Based on Abdel Haleem Translation
An interview with Abdel Haleem about his Qur'an translation.

Living people
Egyptian Muslims
British Muslims
Translators of the Quran into English
Egyptian emigrants to England
Academics of SOAS University of London
Fellows of the Chartered Institute of Linguists
Officers of the Order of the British Empire
20th-century Muslim scholars of Islam
Naturalised citizens of the United Kingdom
21st-century Muslim scholars of Islam
1930 births
Muslim scholars of Islamic studies